Biles Creek is a tributary of the Delaware River in Falls Township, Bucks County, Pennsylvania. Biles arrived in Bucks County on 12 June 1679, three years before the arrival of William Penn.

Statistics
The Geographic Name Information System I.D. is 1169615, U.S. Department of the Interior Geological Survey I.D. is 02938.

Municipalities
Falls Township

See also
List of rivers of Pennsylvania
List of rivers of the United States
List of Delaware River tributaries

References

Rivers of Bucks County, Pennsylvania
Rivers of Pennsylvania
Tributaries of the Delaware River